Beyond the Limits is a 2003 horror-thriller film directed by Olaf Ittenbach and stars Xenia Seeberg, Darren Shahlavi and Timo Rose.

Plot

A young reporter interviews a gravedigger, Vivian Frederick, who tells her about the recently deceased mobster Robert Downing and the attempt to steal an ancient relic with occult powers that ends in a bloodbath. The relic, itself, has been here since the Middle Ages and preserves a terrible secret.

Cast

Awards
Olaf Ittenbach won 2003 the Golden Glibb at Weekend of Fear in Nuremberg, Germany for his film.

Release
The film was released on 23 March 2003 as the Direct-to-video project.

References

External links
 
 Official site

2003 films
2003 horror films
German horror thriller films
English-language German films
German splatter films
Films set in the United States
Films directed by Olaf Ittenbach
2000s German films